The Goff Creek Lodge is a dude ranch in Shoshone National Forest on the east entrance road to Yellowstone National Park. The ranch was probably established c. 1910 by Tex Kennedy. Built in typical dude ranch style with a rustic log lodge surrounded by cabins, its period of significance extends from 1929 to 1950.

References

External links
Goff Creek Lodge at the Wyoming State Historic Preservation Office

Buildings and structures in Park County, Wyoming
Dude ranches in the United States
Hotel buildings on the National Register of Historic Places in Wyoming
Ranches on the National Register of Historic Places in Wyoming
Rustic architecture in Wyoming
Historic districts on the National Register of Historic Places in Wyoming
National Register of Historic Places in Park County, Wyoming